David Izazola Ramírez (born 23 October 1991) is a Mexican former professional footballer who played as a forward, most recently for Kamza in the Albanian Superliga.

Club career
Izazola graduated from the youth academy of UNAM. He started his senior career with Pumas CCH in 2007, in the third tier. In the following season, he moved to the second tier with Pumas Morelos (B-team). In 2011, he was promoted to the senior team. On 22 January, he made his debut, coming on as a substitute for Javier Cortés in a 3–3 draw against Cruz Azul. He played sparingly during the season, with his team winning the Clausura.

Izazola spent the 2012 season with Pumas Morelos. In 2013, he was loaned out to Querétaro, but made no appearance.

On 2 August 2017, Izazola switched to fellow Mexican club Atlante. Three days later, he made his debut in a 1–0 victory against Celaya. After a loan deal with Atlético San Luis, Izazola joined Hungarian club Budapest Honvéd on a six-month long loan deal on 31 January 2015. After returning from loan, he made no further appearance in Apertura 2015 Copa MX, so subsequently he started playing with the under-20 team.

On 16 June 2016, at the age of 24, Izazola announced his retirement from professional football. He published a letter, citing the "treatment given to Mexican soccer players" as the reason behind his early retirement.  However, on 24 December, he came out of retirement and signed for Guatamelan club Comunicaciones.

On 29 January 2018, Izazola signed for Spanish club Salamanca CF. He scored one goal in 11 matches, with his side winning promotion to Segunda División B. On 26 September, he joined Indian I-League club Churchill Brothers. He rescinded his contract ten days later after arriving to India on 15 October, citing the " socio-economic conditions of the country, in addition to the club's sports project" the reason behind his decision. 

On 10 January 2019, Izazola joined Albanian Superliga club Kamza.

International career
Izazola has been capped by Mexico at under-20 level, representing the team at 2011 FIFA U-20 World Cup where his team came third.

Honours
UNAM
Mexican Primera División: Clausura 2011

Mexico U20
CONCACAF U-20 Championship: 2011

References

External links

1991 births
Living people
Mexico under-20 international footballers
Mexico youth international footballers
Mexican expatriate footballers
Mexican footballers
Club Universidad Nacional footballers
Querétaro F.C. footballers
Atlético San Luis footballers
Budapest Honvéd FC players
Comunicaciones F.C. players
Atlante F.C. footballers
Churchill Brothers FC Goa players
FC Kamza players
Liga MX players
Ascenso MX players
Nemzeti Bajnokság I players
Liga Nacional de Fútbol de Guatemala players
Tercera División players
Expatriate footballers in Guatemala
Expatriate footballers in Hungary
Expatriate footballers in Spain
Expatriate footballers in India
Expatriate footballers in Albania
Mexican expatriate sportspeople in Guatemala
Mexican expatriate sportspeople in Hungary
Mexican expatriate sportspeople in Spain
Mexican expatriate sportspeople in India
Mexican expatriate sportspeople in Albania
Footballers from Mexico City
Mexican people of Basque descent
Association football forwards